The H1 Tower is an elevator testing tower in Guangzhou, China, owned by Hitachi. At  it is the tallest elevator testing tower in the world.

The structure includes 15 elevator test shafts, totaling  in length.

See also 

 List of elevator test towers

References 

Hitachi
Elevator test towers
Towers in China
Buildings and structures in Guangzhou